Vienna is a town in Lincoln Parish, Louisiana, United States. The population was 386 at the 2010 census. It is part of the Ruston Micropolitan Statistical Area.

During the American Civil War, Confederate troops drilled at a new camp established in 1862 in Vienna. Later in the war, a parolee camp was established at Vienna.

Geography
Vienna is located in central Lincoln Parish at  (32.606779, -92.650746). U.S. Routes 63 and 167 pass through the center of town together, leading south  to Ruston, the parish seat, and north  to Bernice.

Demographics

2020 census

As of the 2020 United States census, there were 483 people, 201 households, and 153 families residing in the town.

2000 census
As of the census of 2000, there were 424 people, 157 households, and 124 families residing in the town. The racial makeup of the town was 97.64% White, 1.18% African American, 0.47% Asian, and 0.71% from other races. Hispanic or Latino of any race were 0.71% of the population.

There were 157 households, out of which 34.4% had children under the age of 18 living with them, 69.4% were married couples living together, 6.4% had a female householder with no husband present, and 21.0% were non-families. 18.5% of all households were made up of individuals, and 6.4% had someone living alone who was 65 years of age or older. The average household size was 2.70 and the average family size was 3.07.

In the town, the population was spread out, with 26.2% under the age of 18, 7.8% from 18 to 24, 26.9% from 25 to 44, 32.8% from 45 to 64, and 6.4% who were 65 years of age or older. The median age was 39 years. For every 100 females, there were 110.9 males. For every 100 females age 18 and over, there were 104.6 males.

The median income for a household in the town was $58,438, and the median income for a family was $61,000. Males had a median income of $43,542 versus $25,625 for females. The per capita income for the town was $26,013. About 5.2% of families and 6.7% of the population were below the poverty line, including 6.5% of those under age 18 and none of those age 65 or over.

History, 1812 to 1900
Daniel Colvin settled near what is now Vienna in about 1812. 

The Colvins operated a store or relay station of some kind. Their house was near the trail that led from Monroe to Shreveport. Jephthah (son of Daniel) opened the first post office in the region in 1838, originally known as Colvin's Post Office. The name was changed to Vienna in 1850.

Vienna was an overnight stop the stagecoaches on the Monroe-Shreveport Stagecoach Road (later called the Old Wire Road).

References

Towns in Louisiana
Towns in Lincoln Parish, Louisiana
Towns in Ruston, Louisiana micropolitan area